The Ballet Azul (Blue Ballet) is a term coined in Colombia in the 1950s to describe the Millonarios football team, during its successful period from 1949–1964, because the blue color of their uniform, the large number of titles who had won the team, and the quality of its game. The term was first used by the sportscaster Carlos Arturo Rueda.

Later in the 1960s, in Chile, Ecuador and Costa Rica, was used the same term to refer to Universidad de Chile during its successful period from 1959–1969, Emelec, and C.S. Cartaginés respectively.

Millonarios, the first Ballet Azul 
The term was born in the era known as El Dorado in Colombia, when the football league broke away from FIFA because the Colombian football league turned professional in 1948. The Colombian league reached its golden era during the period, and the best footballers in Latin America came to play in Colombia.

In this period the best team was Millonarios, with players like Adolfo Pedernera, a star with the legendary River Plate team of the 1940s better known as La Máquina; Alfredo Di Stefano, who would later star for the legendary Real Madrid team of the 1950s; and Néstor Rossi.

The team won the Colombian League championship in 1949, 1951, 1952, 1953, 1959, 1961, 1962, 1963, 1964

In addition, the best players were part of the Ballet Azul in the era of el Dorado of the Colombian football (1949–1954):

  Alfredo Di Stéfano
  Adolfo Pedernera 
  Néstor Raul Rossi
  Julio Cozzi
  Raúl Pini
  Francisco Zuluaga
  Julio César Ramírez 
  Ismael Soria
  Reinaldo Mourín
  Antonio Báez
  Hugo Reyes
  Carlos Aldabe (Manager)
  Gabriel Ochoa Uribe
  Ramon Villaverde

Universidad de Chile, the Chilean Ballet Azul 

The team won the Chilean league championship in 1959, 1962, 1964, 1965, 1967 and 1969, Tournament Metropolitan in 1968, 1969 and the Cup Francisco Candelori in 1969.

In addition, many of the players were part of the Chile national team that managed to win a bronze medal at the 1962 FIFA World Cup. Following the success, the club was invited to a European tour where they beat teams like Internazionale F.C., champion of Italy and Europe.

Among the most outstanding team members of the Chilean Ballet Azul were:

  Leonel Sánchez 
  Rubén Marcos 
  Luis Eyzaguirre
  Sergio Navarro
  Jaime Ramírez
  Ernesto Alvarez
  Carlos Campos
  Braulio Musso
  Carlos Contreras
  Manuel Astorga
  Alberto Quintano
  Luis Álamos (Manager 1956-1966)
  Ulises Ramos (Manager 1969)

External links
 History of Ballet Azul

References

Football in Chile
Football in Colombia
Football in Ecuador
Football in Costa Rica
Association football culture
Association football terminology
Millonarios F.C.
Club Universidad de Chile